1789 Dobrovolsky is a Flora asteroid from the inner regions of the asteroid belt, approximately 8 kilometers in diameter. It was discovered on 19 August 1966, by Russian astronomer Lyudmila Chernykh at the Crimean Astrophysical Observatory in Nauchnyj on the Crimean peninsula. The asteroid was named after cosmonaut Georgy Dobrovolsky.

Orbit and classification 

Dobrovolsky is a member of the Flora family, a large group of stony S-type asteroids in the inner main-belt. It orbits the Sun in the inner main-belt at a distance of 1.8–2.6 AU once every 3 years and 3 months (1,203 days). Its orbit has an eccentricity of 0.19 and an inclination of 2° with respect to the ecliptic.

Naming 

This minor planet was named in honor of Ukrainian–Soviet cosmonaut Georgy Dobrovolsky, commander of the Soyuz 11 spacecraft, who died on 30 June 1971 during the vehicle's return to Earth after completing the flight program of the first manned orbital station, Salyut. The subsequently numbered minor planets 1790 Volkov and 1791 Patsayev were named in honour of his dead crew members.

The names of all three cosmonauts are also engraved on the plaque next to the sculpture of the Fallen Astronaut on the Moon, which was placed there during the Apollo 15 mission, containing the names of eight American astronauts and six Soviet cosmonauts, who had all died in service. The official  was published by the Minor Planet Center on 1 July 1972.

Physical characteristics

Rotation period 

The so-far best rated rotational lightcurve of Dobrovolsky was obtained from photometric observations by American astronomer Brian A. Skiff in March 2011. It gave a rotation period of 4.812 hours with a brightness variation of 0.13 magnitude. Other lightcurves were obtained by Claes-Ingvar Lagerkvist (in 1973) and at the Palomar Transient Factory (in 2014), giving a period of 5.8, 4.800 and 4.8111 hours, respectively. An international study from February 2016, published a modeled period of 4.811096 hours.

Diameter and albedo 

According to the survey carried out by NASA's Wide-field Infrared Survey Explorer with its subsequent NEOWISE mission, Dobrovolsky measures 7.92 kilometers in diameter and its surface has an albedo of 0.185 (best result), while the Collaborative Asteroid Lightcurve Link assumes an albedo of 0.24 – derived from 8 Flora, the largest member and namesake of its family – and calculates a diameter of 9.85 kilometers with an absolute magnitude of 12.2.

Notes

References

External links 
 Asteroid Lightcurve Database (LCDB), query form (info )
 Dictionary of Minor Planet Names, Google books
 Asteroids and comets rotation curves, CdR – Observatoire de Genève, Raoul Behrend
 Discovery Circumstances: Numbered Minor Planets (1)-(5000) – Minor Planet Center
 
 

001789
Discoveries by Lyudmila Chernykh
Named minor planets
19660819